Severin is a village and a municipality in Bjelovar-Bilogora County, Croatia. There are a total of 877 inhabitants, of which 87% are Croats. The village of Severin has 536 inhabitants, and the village of Orovac has 341.

History
In the late 19th and early 20th century, Severin was part of the Bjelovar-Križevci County of the Kingdom of Croatia-Slavonia.

References

External links
  

Municipalities of Croatia
Populated places in Bjelovar-Bilogora County